The Hunter 420 is an American sailboat that was designed by the Hunter Design Team as a cruiser and first built in 1998.

Production
The design was built by Hunter Marine in the United States between 1998 and 2004, but it is now out of production.

Design
The Hunter 420 is a recreational keelboat, built predominantly of fiberglass. It has a fractional sloop B&R rig, a center-cockpit, a stainless-steel mainsheet traveler arch, a raked stem, a walk-through reverse transom with a swimming platform and folding ladder, an internally mounted spade-type rudder controlled by a wheel and a fixed fin keel.

Factory standard equipment included a 110% roller furling genoa, four two-speed self tailing winches, anodized spars, marine VHF radio, knotmeter, depth sounder, AM/FM radio and CD player with six speakers, dual anchor rollers, hot and cold water transom shower, integral solar panel, sealed teak and holly cabin sole, fully enclosed head with shower, private forward and aft cabins, a dinette table that converts to a berth, complete set of kitchen dishes with custom storage, microwave oven, dual sinks, three-burner gimbaled liquid petroleum gas stove, fog bell and oven and six life jackets. Factory options included  air conditioning, bimini top, an inner forestay for cutter rigging, spinnaker, electric anchor windlass, a clothes washer and drier, and leather cushions.

Variants
Hunter 420 Fin Keel
This model displaces  and carries  of ballast.
Hunter 420 Shoal Keel
This model displaces  and carries  of ballast.

See also
List of sailing boat types

Similar sailboats
C&C 43-1
C&C 43-2
Hunter 43 Legend
Hunter 426
Hunter 430

References

External links
Official brochure

Keelboats
1990s sailboat type designs
Sailing yachts
Sailboat type designs by Hunter Design Team
Sailboat types built by Hunter Marine